Yuriko Yamaguchi is the name of:
Yuriko Yamaguchi (voice actress) (born 1965), Japanese voice actor
Yuriko Yamaguchi (sculptor) (born 1948), Japanese artist